Stress distribution in soil is a function of the type of soil, the relative rigidity of the soil and the footing, and the depth of foundation at level of contact between footing and soil.The estimation of vertical stresses at any point in a soil mass due to external loading is essential to the prediction of settlements of buildings, bridges and pressure.

Some cases

Finitely loaded area

Vertical line load at the surface

Vertical Point Load at the Surface

The solution to the problem of calculating the stresses in an elastic half space subjected to a vertical point load at the surface will be of value in estimating the stresses induced in a deposit of soil whose depth is large compared to the dimensions of that part of the surface
that is loaded.

,

Below centre of uniformly loaded circular area

References

Hydrology
Hydraulic engineering
Soil mechanics
Soil physics